The National Arts Center is a building complex situated in Mount Makiling, Los Baños, Laguna, the Philippines. The establishment was inaugurated in 1976. Its theater is the Tanghalang Maria Makiling or the NAC Center, which has an audience capacity of 1,000 people.

Most of its facilities are operated by the Philippine High School for the Arts except the Pugad Adarna, which is run by the Cultural Center of the Philippines.

Venues aside from the theater include the Pugad Aliguyon or the Marvilla Cottages, the Pugad Adarna or Executive House, a two-story clubhouse called the Bulwagang Sarimanok, and the St. Marc's Chapel. The chapel's cross was designed by Leandro Locsin and features an outline of a crucified Jesus Christ.

References

Landmarks in the Philippines
Los Baños, Laguna
Buildings and structures in Laguna (province)
Education in Laguna (province)
Leandro Locsin buildings